The 1992 John Hancock Bowl was a college football bowl game played on December 31, 1992 at Sun Bowl Stadium in El Paso, Texas.  The game pitted the Baylor Bears against the Arizona Wildcats. It was the final contest of the 1992 NCAA Division I-A football season for both teams, and ended in a 20–15 victory for Baylor.  It was also the final game for Grant Teaff, the long-time Baylor coach, who previously announced his retirement.

Statistics

References

John Hancock Bowl
Sun Bowl
Arizona Wildcats football bowl games
Baylor Bears football bowl games
Bowl Coalition
John Hancock Bowl
December 1992 sports events in the United States